Ayutla is a municipality in the San Marcos Department of Guatemala. It is situated along the Suchiate River natural border with Mexico in the southern part of the department. The municipality center is Ciudad Tecún Umán.  There is a combined road and rail bridge known as Puente Rodolfo Robles linking Ayutla to Ciudad Hidalgo in Chiapas, Mexico.

There exists a railway which was rebuilt in 2019 

In December 2019, the U.S. Treasury Department sanctioned Ayutla's mayor, Erick Zúñiga, under the Foreign Narcotics Kingpin Designation Act, alleging Zúñiga to be "a major drug trafficker," while also alleging that Zúñiga controls a drug trafficking organization and "supplies cocaine to Mexico’s Sinaloa Cartel ."

Climate

Ayutla has tropical savanna climate (Köppen: Aw).

Geographic location

See also

 San Marcos Department
 Rail transport in Central America
 Rail transport in Guatemala
 Rail transport in Mexico

References

External links

Guatemala–Mexico border crossings
Municipalities of the San Marcos Department
Proposed transport infrastructure in Guatemala
Transport in Guatemala